Virginianus is a New Latin term meaning "of Virginia", used in taxonomy to denote species indigenous to or strongly associated with the U.S. state of Virginia and its surrounding areas.

Land animals
 Odocoileus virginianus, white-tailed deer
 Polygyriscus virginianus, a snail 
 Canis virginianus, grey fox

Birds
 Bubo virginianus, great horned owl
 Colinus virginianus, Virginia quail or northern bobwhite
  Cardinalis virginianus, northern cardinal
 Chordeiles virginianus, common nighthawk

Plants
 Botrypus virginianus, rattlesnake fern

See also
 Virginiana (disambiguation)